The 2012–13 Calcio Catania season is the 81st season in club history.

Players

Current squad

On loan

Competitions

Legend

Serie A

League table

Matches

Coppa Italia

Squad statistics

Appearances and goals

|-
! colspan="10" style="background:#dcdcdc; text-align:center"| Goalkeepers

|-
! colspan="10" style="background:#dcdcdc; text-align:center"| Defenders

|-
! colspan="10" style="background:#dcdcdc; text-align:center"| Midfielders

|-
! colspan="10" style="background:#dcdcdc; text-align:center"| Forwards

|-
! colspan="10" style="background:#dcdcdc; text-align:center"| Players transferred out during the season

Top scorers
This includes all competitive matches.  The list is sorted by shirt number when total goals are equal.
{| class="wikitable sortable" style="font-size: 95%; text-align: center;"
|-
!width=15|
!width=15|
!width=15|
!width=15|
!width=150|Name
!width=80|Serie A
!width=80|Coppa Italia
!width=80|Total
|-
|1
|9
|FW
|
|Gonzalo Bergessio
|13
|2
|15
|-
|2
|17
|MF
|
|Alejandro Gómez
|8
|1
|9
|-
|3
|10
|MF
|
|Francesco Lodi
|6
|2
|8
|-
|4
|28
|MF
|
|Pablo Barrientos
|5
|0
|5
|-
|5
|4
|MF
|
|Sergio Almirón
|4
|0
|4
|-
|=
|19
|MF
|
|Lucas Castro
|4
|0
|4
|-
|7
|6
|DF
|
|Nicola Legrottaglie
|3
|0
|3
|-
|8
|3
|DF
|
|Nicolás Spolli
|2
|0
|2
|-
|=
|12
|DF
|
|Giovanni Marchese
|2
|0
|2
|-
|10
|13
|MF
|
|Mariano Izco
|1
|0
|1
|-
|=
|16
|MF
|
|Mario Paglialunga
|1
|0
|1
|-
|=
|26
|MF
|
|Keko
|1
|0
|1

Sources

Calcio Catania
Catania S.S.D. seasons